Young Arena is a 3,000-seat multi-purpose arena in Waterloo, Iowa, United States, and was built in 1994.  It is home to the Waterloo Black Hawks of the United States Hockey League, the Waterloo Warriors of the Midwest High School Hockey League, the Waterloo Youth Hockey Association, the University of Northern Iowa Hockey Club, the Waterloo Adult Hockey Association and the Cedar Valley Figure Skating Club.  Young Arena has also hosted the NCAA Division III wrestling championships, AAU youth wrestling tournaments and a College basketball game in December 1997 between UNI and UMKC.

References

External links
Official website

Waterloo Cedar Falls Courier

Waterloo Adult Hockey Association

Sports venues in Iowa
Indoor arenas in Iowa
Indoor ice hockey venues in the United States
Buildings and structures in Waterloo, Iowa
Tourist attractions in Black Hawk County, Iowa
1994 establishments in Iowa
Sports venues completed in 1994
Figure skating venues in the United States
Basketball venues in Iowa
College wrestling venues in the United States